Russell Werner Lee (July 21, 1903 – August 28, 1986) was an American photographer and photojournalist, best known for his work for the Farm Security Administration (FSA) during the Great Depression. His images documented the ethnography of various American classes and cultures.

Early life 

The son of Burton Lee and his wife Adeline Werner, Lee grew up in Ottawa, Illinois. He attended Culver Military Academy in Culver, Indiana, for high school. He earned a bachelor's degree in chemical engineering from Lehigh University in Bethlehem, Pennsylvania.

Lee started working as a chemist, but gave up the position to become a painter. Originally he used photography as a precursor to his painting, but soon became interested in photography for its own sake. He recorded the people and places around him. Among his earliest subjects were Pennsylvanian bootleg mining and the Father Divine cult.

Photography 
In the fall of 1936, during the Great Depression, Lee was hired for the federally sponsored Farm Security Administration (FSA) photographic documentation project of the Franklin D. Roosevelt administration. He joined a team assembled under Roy Stryker, along with Dorothea Lange, Arthur Rothstein, and Walker Evans. Stryker provided direction and bureaucratic protection to the group, leaving the photographers free to compile what in 1973 was described as "the greatest documentary collection which has ever been assembled." Lee created some of the iconic images produced by the FSA, including photographic studies of San Augustine, Texas, in 1939, and Pie Town, New Mexico, in 1940.

Over the spring and summer of 1942, Lee was one of several government photographers to document the forced relocation of Japanese Americans from the West Coast. He produced more than 600 images of families waiting to be removed and their later lives in various detention facilities, most located in isolated areas of the interior of the country.

After the FSA was defunded in 1943, Lee served in the Air Transport Command (ATC). During this period, he took photographs of all the airfield approaches used by the ATC to supply the Armed Forces in World War II. In 1946 and 1947, he worked for the United States Department of the Interior (DOI), helping the agency compile a medical survey in communities involved in mining bituminous coal. He created over 4,000 photographs of miners and their working conditions in coal mines. In 1946, Lee completed a series of photos focused on a Pentecostal Church of God in a Kentucky coal camp.

While completing the DOI work, Lee also continued to work under Stryker. He produced public relations photographs for Standard Oil of New Jersey.

In 1947 Lee moved to Austin, Texas, and continued photography. In 1965 he became the first instructor of photography at the University of Texas there.

Legacy
Lee's work is held in collections at the University of Louisville, the New Mexico Museum of Art, Wittliff collections, Texas State University; and the Dolph Briscoe Center for American History at the University of Texas at Austin.

In 2016, Lee Elementary, a school in the Austin Independent School District, was renamed Russell Lee Elementary in honor of the photographer.

Selected photographs

References

External links

Bernard Bourrit, "Russell Lee, impossible inventaire" in Gruppen, 2017.
Biographical Sketch of Lee
Online Russell Lee collection
Article about Lee at the University of Texas website
Flickr Photostream: LOC's Archive of Russell Lee's FSA Photos
Wittliff Collection Southwestern and Mexican Photography, Texas State University
"Captured: America in Color from 1939–1943", Denver Post PLog, July 26, 2010.
Brisco – A Guide to the Russell Lee Photograph Collection, University of Texas
Russell Lee's FSA Photos of Pie Town, New Mexico Museum of Art

1903 births
1986 deaths
American photojournalists
Artists from Austin, Texas
Social realism
University of Texas at Austin faculty
People from Ottawa, Illinois
Military personnel from Illinois
Lehigh University alumni
Culver Academies alumni